Ernest Lee Jones (born December 15, 1964) is a former American professional football player who was a wide receiver in the National Football League (NFL) and the World League of American Football (WLAF). He played for the Phoenix Cardinals and the Los Angeles Rams of the NFL, and the Amsterdam Admirals of the WLAF. Jones played collegiately at Indiana University.

See also
 List of NCAA major college football yearly receiving leaders

External links
 

1964 births
Living people
American football wide receivers
Amsterdam Admirals players
Indiana Hoosiers football players
Los Angeles Rams players
People from Elkhart, Indiana
Phoenix Cardinals players
Players of American football from Indiana